Rajvinder Grewal (born September 11, 1985) is a former Canadian politician who represented the riding of Brampton East in the House of Commons of Canada from 2015 to 2019. Elected as a Liberal in the 2015 Canadian federal election, he resigned from caucus in 2018 after a police investigation into his extensive gambling debts, and did not stand in the 2019 Canadian federal election. In September 2020, he was charged by the Royal Canadian Mounted Police for breach of trust and fraud over $5,000.

Before politics 
The son of an airport cab driver, Grewal attended Wilfrid Laurier University, where he earned a bachelor's degree in business, and then completed an MBA at York University's Schulich School of Business and a law degree at Osgoode Hall Law School. Prior to his legal studies he worked as a financial analyst, while after becoming a lawyer he specialized in mergers, acquisitions and corporate finance on Bay Street.

Federal politics 
Grewal's nomination to represent the Liberal Party of Canada in the 2015 election in Brampton East was attended by some controversy, as initial media reports indicated that a brawl took place at the nominating convention when several hundred members were denied the ability to vote.  Police attended the scene in a crowd control capacity.  Liberal Party officials subsequently denied that there had been any fighting at the scene.

In early 2018, the Ethics Commissioner launched an investigation into whether Grewal violated the conflict-of-interest code when he invited Yusuf Yenilmez, the head of Zgemi Inc., to multiple events during Justin Trudeau’s trip to India. Grewal had been paid by Zgemi Inc. for legal advice during the previous year.

According to his most recent disclosure to the Ethics Commissioner, Grewal had lines of credit with Royal Bank of Canada, Toronto Dominion Bank and Bank of Nova Scotia, as well as the joint mortgage with HSBC Canada. In addition, Mr. Grewal disclosed that he had received employment income from Zgemi Inc. and a law firm called Gahir & Associates during his time in the House. Parliamentary rules do not require members of Parliament (MPs) to reveal the amounts they were paid, and there is no threshold for disclosure. Backbenchers are subject to fewer rules than ministers in terms of disclosure.

Grewal was a member of the influential finance committee of the House of Commons, before being moved to the health committee in September 2018.

Departure from Liberal caucus and criminal charges

Grewal announced on November 22, 2018 that he intended to resign as MP and was leaving federal politics for personal and medical reasons. A statement released the next day by a spokesperson for the Prime Minister's Office clarified that Grewal was resigning to seek treatment for problem gambling which had "led him to incur significant personal debts." Grewal reportedly gambled millions of dollars between 2015 and 2018, including at the Casino du Lac-Leamy. The casino's disclosure to FINTRAC then led to an RCMP investigation.

In a statement on November 26, 2018 the Office of the Ethics Commissioner said its investigation "will continue as soon as possible in spite of [Grewal’s] resignation." In its official comment the week before, the Prime Minister’s Office said it was aware "of inquiries by the RCMP regarding the circumstances that were the subject of a complaint to the Ethics Commissioner about Mr. Grewal earlier this year." The RCMP's national division would not confirm or deny that it is investigating Grewal.

On November 30, 2018, Grewal announced that he was quitting the Liberal caucus but would keep his seat in the House of Commons "for the time being." In a December 2018 Facebook video, Grewal said that in a three-year period at Lac-Leamy, playing recreational blackjack became a high-stakes gambling problem, which led him to incur high levels of debt that he kept hidden from his family. Grewal claimed that he only borrowed money from loved ones in a legal manner. On January 25, 2019, he announced that he would keep his seat in parliament as an Independent MP until the next federal election in October. Grewal did not stand for re-election in the 2019 federal election.

In September 2020, Grewal was charged by the RCMP with four counts of breach of trust and one count of fraud over $5,000 under the Criminal Code. The RCMP allege that Grewal received millions in personal loans that he neglected to report to the Ethics Commissioner, which would constitute a criminal breach of trust. The RCMP also allege that Grewal misused his constituency office budget for personal use and solicited loans that personally benefited him in connection with using his office as an MP. His trial is scheduled to begin on October 18, 2021.

Electoral record

References

External links

Living people
1985 births
21st-century Canadian politicians
Canadian politicians of Indian descent
Independent MPs in the Canadian House of Commons
Lawyers in Ontario
Liberal Party of Canada MPs
Members of the House of Commons of Canada from Ontario
Osgoode Hall Law School alumni
Politicians from Brampton
Politicians from Calgary
Wilfrid Laurier University alumni
York University alumni